Between the Concrete & Clouds is the sixth studio album by American indie rock musician Kevin Devine.  It was his first album since 2009, released via Razor & Tie / Favorite Gentlemen.

It is the first record of Devine's made that is fully backed by a band (previous albums typically feature at least one acoustic song) and his fourth produced by Chris Bracco (Bracco co-produced Devine's Make the Clocks Move and Split the Country, Split the Street with Mike Skinner and produced 2009's Brother's Blood). The album was mixed by Rob Schnapf, who produced Devine's 2006 album Put Your Ghost to Rest and the 2008 single Another Bag of Bones. "The combination of Chris and Rob on this record kind of marries the best aspects of everything I’ve tried to do over the past ten years" says Kevin.

The UK CD of the album, released via Big Scary Monsters, features 2 bonus tracks, "Part of the Whole" and "Luxembourg", Devine's previous two singles (produced by Schnapf) released prior to Between the Concrete & Clouds.

Track listing
 "Off-Screen"  – 4:17
 "The First Hit"  – 3:24
 "Sleepwalking Through My Life"  – 3:22
 "Awake in the Dirt"  – 3:07
 "Between the Concrete & Clouds"  – 4:05
 "11-17"  – 4:25
 "Wait Out the Wreck"  – 2:01
 "A Story, A Sneak"  – 4:52
 "The City Has Left You Alone"  – 3:47
 "I Used to Be Someone"  – 5:53

References

Kevin Devine albums
2011 albums
Big Scary Monsters Recording Company albums